Motorola A925 is a 3G smartphone from Motorola using Symbian OS. Among the most notable features is its built-in A-GPS. The A925 was preceded by the featurewise essentially identical Motorola A920, and was succeeded by the Motorola A1000.
 
The A925 was developed jointly between Motorola and mobile network operator 3, and therefore was only available for purchase through 3. This also leading to it being SIM locked to 3, and the phone's software with branding  possibilities related "3" and no official unbranded firmware available.

Features
 Mobile phone technologies
 UMTS
 GSM 900, 1800 and 1900 MHz
 GPRS
 Physical attributes
 148.5 × 60 × 24 mm
 212 g
 Hardware
 ARM processor at 168 MHz
 32 MB RAM
 32 MB ROM
 12 MB internal user-accessible storage
 Secure Digital card slot
 A-GPS
 Camera with up to 640 × 480 pixel still image size
 USB connectivity to computers
 Bluetooth
 Infrared port
 Display
 TFT LCD, touchscreen, handwriting recognition
 40 × 61 mm
 208 × 320 pixels
 16-bit color depth / 65536 colors
 Operating system
 Symbian OS 7.0
 UIQ 2.0 user interface
 Java
 Java ME MIDP 1.0, CLDC 1.0
 PersonalJava

Motorola smartphones
Symbian devices
Mobile phones with infrared transmitter